Berthold of Calabria (died 1195) was a Calabrian crusader and saint who established a hermit colony on Mount Carmel in 1185. He was introduced into Carmelite literature around the 15th century as Saint Berthold of Mount Carmel and is said to have been a general of the Order before Brocard.

Berthold was a son of the Count of Limoges and was born in Malifaye in southwest France. The label "Calabrian" was a contemporary euphemism for "Westerner." Berthold was a nephew of Aymeric of Malifaye, the Latin patriarch of Antioch.

Berthold went to the Holy Land as part of the Crusades and was in Antioch when it was besieged by the Saracens. During this time he had a vision of Christ denouncing the soldiers' evil methods. At the time, hermits from the West were scattered throughout Palestine. Some accounts hold that in 1185 he came to Mount Carmel, built a small chapel there and gathered a community of hermits who would live at his side in imitation of the prophet Elijah. This community was believed to have given rise to the Order of the Carmelites, but this is not supported by evidence and is discounted by historians of the Order. Berthold lived out his days on Mount Carmel, ruling the community he had founded for forty-five years until his death in 1195.

Tradition holds that he was accepted as leader of the hermits by Brocard.  His feast day is celebrated on March 29.

See also
 Hermit
 Discalced Carmelites
 Carmelite Rule of St. Albert
 Book of the First Monks
 Constitutions of the Carmelite Order
 Dialogues of the Carmelites

References

External links
Carmelite Spirituality and Vocation
"Sayings of Light and Love" - Spiritual Maxims of John of the Cross

Founders of Catholic religious communities
Carmelites
French hermits
Palestinian hermits
12th-century Christian saints
Medieval French saints
1195 deaths
Year of birth missing
Christians of the Second Crusade
Priors General of the Order of Carmelites